The Atlanta Northern Railway Company was organized in 1903 by the Georgia Railway and Power Company to build a railway line from Atlanta to Marietta, Georgia. It opened with an 18-mile route on July 17, 1905. The line was abandoned in 1947 together with the Atlanta street railway system.

See also
Ashby Street Trolly Barn

References

Defunct Georgia (U.S. state) railroads
Interurban railways in Georgia (U.S. state)
Transportation in Fulton County, Georgia
Railway companies established in 1903
Railway companies disestablished in 1947
Transportation in Cobb County, Georgia